Dhaniram Verma was an Indian politician from Samajwadi Party who served as the 13th Speaker of the Uttar Pradesh Legislative Assembly from 1993 to 1995. He also served as the Leader of the Opposition in the Uttar Pradesh Legislative Assembly from 1997 to 2001.

References 

Uttar Pradesh politicians
1930 births
2012 deaths